Thames Valley Delta Blues is a 2002 album by Tom Hingley.

Track listing
"Waiting For The Walls To Come Down"
"All The Good Things"
"The Gloves Are Off"
"Thirst Born"
"Good"
"The Lake Of Fire"
"Did You See That Girl"
"Don't Want To Be A Fighter Any More"
"Everyday"
"Love You In The Morning"
"Love Week"
"Northern Star"
"The Gun"
"She"
"Tiny Babies"

External links
Townsend Records

2000 albums
Tom Hingley albums